Washington Street Methodist Church is a historic Methodist church located at Petersburg, Virginia. It was built in 1842, and is a one-story with gallery, brick building in the Greek Revival style. It features a massive Greek Doric order pedimented tetrastyle portico added in 1890. Wings were added in 1922–1923, connected to the main building by columned hyphens.

It was listed on the National Register of Historic Places in 1980.

References

19th-century Methodist church buildings in the United States
United Methodist churches in Virginia
Churches on the National Register of Historic Places in Virginia
Greek Revival church buildings in Virginia
Churches completed in 1842
Buildings and structures in Petersburg, Virginia
National Register of Historic Places in Petersburg, Virginia